Palakkad District is one of the main centre of education in Kerala state India. Palakkad District has Prominent Educational Institutions provide platform for various level of education . The district is home to the only Indian Institute of Technology in Kerala state. Palakkad District has three educational districts namely Palakkad, Ottappalam and Mannarkkad. There are several educational institutions working across the district. Government Victoria College, Palakkad, Government Engineering College, Sreekrishnapuram, NSS College of Engineering, Government Medical College, Palakkad, Chembai Memorial Government Music College, and many more higher level of educational institutions are located in 
Palakkad District.

Autonomous higher education institutes
 Indian Institute of Technology

Government Engineering Colleges
Government Engineering College, Sreekrishnapuram
NSS College of Engineering

Government Polytechnic Colleges
 Government Polytechnic, Kodumba, Palakkad,
 Model Residential Polytechnic College Kuzhalmannam
 Institute of Printing Technology & Government Polytechnic College, Kulappully, Shoranur, 679122, Palakkad

Professional colleges

Civil service 
 Kerala State Civil Service Academy, Palakkad Subcenter 
 Siva's IAS Academy, Mercy College Jn, Palakkad

Law 
 Nehru Academy of Law
 V.R. Krishnan Ezhuthachan Law College,Elavanchery,Kollengode

Medical Colleges 
 Government Medical College, Palakkad 	
 Karuna Medical College,  Vilayodi, Palakkad
 PK DAS Institute of Medical Sciences, Ottapalam
 Kerala Medical College, Mangode, Palakkad

Ayurveda Medical Colleges and Institutions 
 Ahalia Ayurveda Medical College, Palakkad	
 Poomulli Neelakandan Nampoodiripad Memorial Ayurveda Medical College, Shoranur	
 Santhigiri Ayurveda Medical College, Olassery Palakkad
 Vishnu Ayurveda College, Shoranur
 Regional Agricultural Research Station, Pattambi, Palakkad

Nursing Colleges 
 Karuna College of Nursing, Chittur	
 Seventh Day Adventist College of Nursing, Ottapalam	
 SI-MET College of Nursing, Malampuzha	
 SI-MET College of Nursing, Mundur

Dental Colleges 
 Royal Dental College, Palakkad

Private Self Financing Engineering and technology Institutes 
 Ahalia School of Engineering & Technology, Palakkad	
 Al-Ameen Engineering College, Shornur, Palakkad
 Ammini College of Engineering
 Chathanmkulam Institute of Research and Advanced Studies, Menonpara		
 Jawaharlal College of Engineering and Technology, Mangalam		
 Prime College of Engineering
 Sreepathy Institute of Management and Technology
 NDFC Technical Institute & College for the Deaf, Shangaramangalam, Pattambi, Palakkad

Private Polytechnic Colleges
 St. Mary's Polytechnic College, Valliyode, Palakkad
 Aries Polytechnic College, Palakkad
 Malabar Polytechnic Campus, Cherpulassery,Palakkad

Architecture
 Global Institute of Architecture, Palakkad
Sneha College of Architecture, Govindapuram,Kollengode

Government Arts and Science Colleges
 Government Victoria College, Palakkad (est. 1888)
 Sree Neelakanta Government Sanskrit College Pattambi
 Government College, Chittur, Palakkad (est. 1947)
 Government Arts & Science College, Pathirippala, Palakkad
 Govt. Arts and Science College, Kozhinjampara
 Govt. Arts and Science College, Nattukal, Palakkad 
 Rajiv Gandhi Memorial Govt Arts & Science College, Attappadi, Palakkad (est. 2012)

Government IHRD Colleges
 College of Applied Science, Vadakkencherry, Palakkad (est. 1993)
 College of Applied Science, Malampuzha, Kalleppully, Palakkad (est. 2008)
 College of Applied Science, Kuzhalmannam, Kottayi, Palakkad (est. 2008)
 College of Applied Science, Attappadi, Palakkad (est. 2010)
 College of Applied Science, Ayalur, Palakkad (est. 2012)

Government ITI'S
 Industrial training institute, Malampuzha
 ITI (W) Malampuzha
 ITI Kuzhalamnnam
 ITI Vaniyamkulam
 ITI Nemmara
 ITI Perumatty
 ITI Kozhinjampara
 ITI Elumbalassery (Lt. Col. Niranjan Memorial)

Arts and Science
 Chembai Memorial Government Music College, Palakkad (est. 2000)
 NSS College, Ottapalam, Palakkad (est. 1961)
 NSS College, Nenmara, Palakkad (est. 1967)
 MES Kalladi College, Mannarkkad (est. 1967)
 A.W.H. College of Science and Technology, Palakkad
 Institute for Communicative and Cognitive Neuro Sciences, Palakkad
 Karuna Arts and Science College, Palakkad
 M.P.M.M.S.N. Trust College, Shornur
 Mercy College, Palakkad
 Minority Arts and Science College, Padinjarangadi
 Royal Institute of Science and Technology, Palakkad
 Sree Neelakanda Govt. Sanskrit College, Pattambi
 Sree Narayana College, Alathur
 Sree Vyasa N.S.S. College, Vadakkancherry
 Sreekrishnapuram V.T. Bhattathiripad College, Mannampatta
 Thunchath Ezhuthachan College of Management, Information Technology and Biotechnology, Palakkad
 V.V. College of Science and Technology, Palakkad
 Yuvakshethra Institute of Management Studies, Palakkad

Teacher Training Institutes 
 Sneha College of Teacher Education, Govindapuram, Kollengode

High schools
 Bharatha Matha Higher Secondary School
 Basel Evangelical Mission Higher Secondary School
 Jawahar Navodaya Vidyalaya, Palakkad
 BSS Gurukulam Higher Secondary School
 Basel Evangelical Mission Higher Secondary School, Palakkad
 Holy Trinity School, Kanjikode
 MES Pattambi
 Palghat Lions Senior Secondary school
 Moyen Memorial School, Palakkad
 Kanikkamatha Convent - English Medium Higher Secondary School
 A.S.M.H.S.S. Alathur
 Kuttikode English Medium Central School, Kuttikode, Cherpulassery
 PMGHSS, Palakkad 
 Vasavi Vidhyalaya CBSE School, Palakkad
 Pandit Motilal School, Palakkad
 St. Thomas Convent School, Olavakkode
 Gvhss Cherpulassery 
 Bhavan's Vidya Mandir, Chithali
 Guardian Public School, Para
 St. Raphael's Higher Secondary School, Chakkanthara
 Vyasa Vidya Peethom CBSE School
 MES Public School, Olavakkode
 Amrita Public School
 Nirmala Matha ICSE School, Malampuzha
 St. Agnes Public School
 St Francis School (ICSE)
 Sreekrishnapuram Central School

Medical Transcription 
 Tranz Medisolutions
 Silicon Square

Music 
 Chembai Memorial Government Music College

See also
 List of colleges affiliated to the University of Calicut, some being in Palakkad district
 Palakkad district
 Indian Institute of Technology

References

 https://www.hindustantimes.com/india/college-students-gift-retiring-principal-a-grave-later-arrested/story-6L3KWH4hNHFz2mauDf3ssK.html
 https://iitpkd.ac.in/
 https://www.dietpalakkad.org/main-links/profile/educational-profile/
 https://www.thehindu.com/todays-paper/tp-national/tp-kerala/new-varieties-of-crops-recommended/article4943777.ece
 https://sites.google.com/gecskp.ac.in/cgpu2/placement-history